Kingsbury is a census-designated place (CDP) in Douglas County, Nevada, United States. The population was 2,152 at the 2010 census.

Geography
Kingsbury is located at  (38.973450, -119.902674).

Climate
Kingsbury has a humid continental climate (Dfb). Summers are typically mild – warm and dry, with very cool nights. Winters are some of the coldest in the state, with highs in the 30s and lows around 20. Annual snowfall is very heavy, averaging . The average first and last snowfalls occur on September 17 and June 15. The average snow depth of at least an inch lasts from November 17 to April 28. The average first and last freeze dates are September 20 and June 13, giving Kingsbury an average growing season of 109 days. The average first and last dates of a warm  temperature are June 3 and September 18. Kingsbury is one of the wettest towns in the state of Nevada.

Demographics

As of the census of 2000, there were 2,624 people, 1,176 households, and 684 families residing in the CDP. The racial makeup of the CDP was 93.3% White, 0.5% African American, 0.6% Native American, 2.1% Asian, 0.2% Pacific Islander, 1.6% from other races, and 1.7% from two or more races. Hispanic or Latino of any race were 4.2% of the population.

There were 1,176 households, out of which 21.9% had children under the age of 18 living with them, 50.6% were married couples living together, 4.7% had a female householder with no husband present, and 41.8% were non-families. 27.3% of all households were made up of individuals, and 4.3% had someone living alone who was 65 years of age or older. The average household size was 2.23 and the average family size was 2.71.

In the CDP, the population was spread out, with 17.4% under the age of 18, 6.6% from 18 to 24, 32.8% from 25 to 44, 32.4% from 45 to 64, and 10.8% who were 65 years of age or older. The median age was 42 years. For every 100 females, there were 120.3 males. For every 100 females age 18 and over, there were 124.0 males.

The median income for a household in the CDP was $59,511, and the median income for a family was $73,333. Males had a median income of $40,208 versus $31,652 for females. The per capita income for the CDP was $41,451. About 3.0% of families and 4.9% of the population were below the poverty line, including none of those under age 18 and 12.4% of those age 65 or over.

See also

 List of census-designated places in Nevada

References

External links

 Carson Valley Area Weather

Census-designated places in Nevada
Census-designated places in Douglas County, Nevada